The 2008 China Open Super Series is the twelfth tournament of the 2008 BWF Super Series in badminton. It was held in Shanghai, China from November 18 to November 23, 2008.

Men's singles

Seeds
 Lee Chong Wei
 Lin Dan
 Chen Jin
 Bao Chunlai
 Peter Gade
 Joachim Persson
 Taufik Hidayat
 Park Sung Hwan

Results

Women's singles

Seeds
 Zhou Mi
 Lu Lan
 Tine Rasmussen
 Xie Xingfang
 Zhu Lin
 Pi Hongyan
 Wong Mew Choo
 Xu Huaiwen

Results

Men's doubles

Seeds
 Cai Yun / Fu Haifeng
 Lars Paaske / Jonas Rasmussen
 Jung Jae-sung / Lee Yong-dae
 Mohd Zakry Abdul Latif / Mohd Fairuzizuan
 Koo Kien Keat / Tan Boon Heong
 Mathias Boe / Carsten Mogensen
 Choong Tan Fook / Lee Wan Wah
 Tony Gunawan /  Candra Wijaya

Results

Women's doubles

Seeds
 Du Jing / Yu Yang
 Chin Eei Hui / Wong Pei Tty
 Lena Frier Kristiansen / Kamilla Rytter Juhl
 Ha Jung-eun / Kim Min-jung
 Zhang Yawen / Zhao Tingting
 Duanganong Aroonkesorn / Kunchala Voravichitchaikul
 Nicole Grether /  Charmaine Reid
 Cheng Shu / Zhao Yunlei

Results

Mixed doubles

Seeds
 He Hanbin / Yu Yang
 Xie Zhongbo / Zhang Yawen
 Thomas Laybourn / Kamilla Rytter Juhl
 Sudket Prapakamol / Saralee Thoungthongkam
 Lee Yong-dae / Lee Hyo-jung
 Anthony Clark / Donna Kellogg
 Robert Blair /  Imogen Bankier
 Songphon Anugritayawon / Kunchala Voravichitchaikul

Results

External links
China Open Super Series 08 at tournamentsoftware.com

China Open Super Series, 2008
China Open (badminton)
China Open
Sports competitions in Shanghai